There are two bridges across the Ohio River on Interstate 275 (Ohio–Indiana–Kentucky):

Carroll Lee Cropper Bridge, between Indiana and Kentucky
Combs–Hehl Bridge, between Kentucky and Ohio

Bridges on the Interstate Highway System
2 bridge